Ngozi Ezeonu (born Ngozi Ikpelue, May 23, 1965) is a Nigerian actress and former journalist notable for her portrayal of archetypal mothers in Nollywood movies.  In 2012, she starred in Adesuwa, a role that earned her the Best Supporting Actress nomination at the 8th Africa Movie Academy Awards .

Early life
A native of Ogbunike, in Anambra State. Ezeonu was born in Owerri to Dennis and Ezenwanyi Ikpelue, and has six siblings. Prior to finding fame as an actress, she studied Journalism at the Nigerian Institute of Journalism and worked for Radio Lagos and Eko FM.

Career
Although best known for her maternal roles, Ezeonu was originally cast as younger characters at the start of her acting career. In 1993, veteran film director Zeb Ejiro offered Ezeonu a supporting role as Nkechi, the antagonist's best friend in the Igbo blockbuster Nneka the Pretty Serpent in 1994. This was followed by her role in Glamour Girls the same year as Thelma, a high society mistress.

Filmography
She has featured in more than 150 Nollywood films. Among them:

1994 – 2007 

 Ada Vigilante
 End of Ada Vigilante
 Evil Project
 Senseless
 Best Honeymoon
 Enslaved
 Definition of Love  
 End of a Princess
 Glamour Girls – 1994
 Nneka The Pretty Serpent – 1994   
I Swear – 2004
 Occultic Kingdom – 2005
 Abuja Top Ladies – 2006
 The Love Doctor – 2007
 Royal Grandmother 1 and 2 – 2007

2008 – 2016 

 Tears in My Eyes – 2008
 Throne of Tears 1, 2 and 3 – 2008
 My Darling Princess – 2008
 Tears of a Prince – 2009
 Sister Mary and Ossy – 2009
 Stone Face – 2009  
 Secret Shadows 1 and 2 – 2010
 Wise In-Laws – 2010
 A Private Storm – 2010
 Adesuwa – 2012
 Shattered Mirror – 2012
 The Kings and Gods – 2012
 Broken Engagement – 2013  
 Palace War – 2014
 Tears of a Virgin – 2014   
 Luscious Lucy – 2016
 Tears of the Innocent – 2016
 Zenith of Sacrifice – 2016  
 Heritage – 2016

2017 – 2019 

 Tears and Glory – 2017
 Child of Pain – 2017
 Tell Me Why – 2017
 Pretty Little Thing – 2017
 Family Secret – 2017   
 A Better Family – 2018  
 Lion Heart – 2018
 Confessor – 2018
 Different Worlds – 2019
 Seed of Destruction – 2019
 Dusted Crown – 2019
 Crazy Princess – 2019
 On All Sides – 2019
 Run Away From Love – 2019
 If Trouble Comes – 2019
 Making a King – 2019

2020 – 2021 
Nkasi my flesh and blood
Prince Decision

Awards and nominations

References

External links

Ngozi Ezeonu Films on iROKOTv

Actresses from Anambra State
20th-century Nigerian actresses
21st-century Nigerian actresses
Living people
Nigerian film actresses
1965 births
Igbo actresses
Nigerian journalists